Tau Leonis (τ Leo) is a star in the zodiac constellation of Leo. Because it is located near the ecliptic, it is subject to occultations by the Moon. It has an apparent visual magnitude of 5.00, which is bright enough to be seen with the naked eye. The distance to this star, as estimated using parallax measurements, is 560 light years. It is moving closer to the Sun with a radial velocity of −9 km/s.

This G-type giant star has a stellar classification of G8- IIIa and currently resides on the red giant branch. It has about 390% of the Sun's mass. The star is much younger than the Sun, with an age of around 190 million years. As an evolved giant, it has expanded to about 25 times the Sun's radius and radiates 330 times the luminosity of the Sun. The effective temperature of the outer atmosphere is 4,910 K.

References

G-type giants
Leonis, Tau
Leo (constellation)
BD+03 2504
Leonis, 84
099648
0055945
4418